Qeshlaq-e Daylar (also Romanized as Qeshlāq-e Dāylar) is a village in Sehhatabad Rural District in the Central District of Eshtehard County, Alborz Province, Iran. At the 2006 census, its population was 46, in 8 families.

References 

Populated places in Eshtehard County